14th Street is a major crosstown street in the New York City borough of Manhattan, traveling between Eleventh Avenue on Manhattan's West Side and Avenue C on Manhattan's East Side. It forms a boundary between several neighborhoods and is sometimes considered the border between Lower Manhattan and Midtown Manhattan.

At Broadway, 14th Street forms the southern boundary of Union Square. It is also considered the southern boundary of Chelsea, Flatiron/Lower Midtown, and Gramercy, and the northern boundary of Greenwich Village, Alphabet City, and the East Village. West of Third Avenue, 14th Street marks the southern terminus of western Manhattan's grid system. North of 14th Street, the streets make up a near-perfect grid that runs in numerical order. South of 14th, the grid continues in the East Village almost perfectly, except in Greenwich Village, where an older and less uniform grid plan applies.

In the early history of New York City, 14th Street was an upscale location. However, it lost its glamour and status as the city grew northward and today it is primarily zoned as a commercial street. In October 2019, a busway restriction was put in place between Third and Ninth Avenues, prohibiting most types of vehicles during the daytime.

History

Description 
West 14th Street begins at an interchange with New York State Route 9A northeast of Greenwich Village. At the end of the interchange, it intersects with 10th Avenue. The street continues east, intersecting with Washington Street, Ninth Avenue/Hudson Street, Eighth Avenue, Seventh Avenue, Sixth Avenue, and Fifth Avenue. After Fifth Avenue, West 14th Street becomes East 14th Street and goes on to form the southern border of Union Square between University Place and Fourth Avenue. East of Fourth Avenue, 14th Street forms the southern end of Irving Place, a north–south road that terminates at Gramercy Park. 14th Street then intersects with Third Avenue, which forms the border between the neighborhoods of the East Village to the south and Gramercy to the north. The street goes on to intersect with Second Avenue. At First Avenue, 14th Street widens from a four-lane road to a six-lane divided boulevard with a westbound service road. It then intersects with the main thoroughfares of Alphabet City: Avenue A, Avenue B, and Avenue C, where the street terminates. It formerly terminated at FDR Drive via an on-ramp to the southbound FDR before the September 11 attacks, when the New York Police Department vacated the portion between Avenue C and FDR due to the presence of the nearby ConEdison East River Generating Station along 14th and 15th Streets as a possible terrorist target.

Since October 2019, vehicle restrictions are in place on 14th Street between Third and Ninth Avenues from 6 a.m. to 10 p.m. The only vehicles that can use the busway are buses, trucks making deliveries on 14th Street, emergency and Access-A-Ride vehicles, and local traffic traveling for no more than one block.

Public transportation

14th Street is well served by the New York City Subway. The BMT Canarsie Line runs underneath 14th Street from Eighth Avenue to the East River, stopping at Eighth Avenue, Sixth Avenue, Union Square, Third Avenue, and First Avenue. Additionally, every subway route that crosses 14th Street has a stop there, except for the :

 14th Street–Union Square on the BMT Canarsie Line, BMT Broadway Line, and IRT Lexington Avenue Line serving the 
 14th Street/Sixth Avenue on the IRT Broadway–Seventh Avenue Line, BMT Canarsie Line, and IND Sixth Avenue Line serving the 
 14th Street–Eighth Avenue on the BMT Canarsie Line and IND Eighth Avenue Line serving the 

A station at Second Avenue and 14th Street is planned as part of Phase 3 of the Second Avenue Subway, which is currently unfunded.

PATH also makes a stop at 14th Street at its intersection with Sixth Avenue.

In the past, every former IRT elevated line had a station at 14th Street:

14th Street on the IRT Second Avenue Line
14th Street on the IRT Third Avenue Line
14th Street on the IRT Sixth Avenue Line
14th Street on the IRT Ninth Avenue Line

Bus priority and truck access
Alongside the Canarsie Tunnel closure between 2019 and 2020, the New York City Department of Transportation began planning conversion of 14th Street between Third and Ninth Avenues into a bus-only corridor during rush hours. The department began planning a new Select Bus Service bus rapid transit route to be implemented across 14th Street. At the time, the M14A/D routes were among the busiest and slowest NYCT bus routes. The M14A/D were converted to Select Bus Service routes on July 1, 2019.

The 14th Street busway was inspired by Toronto's successful King Street Pilot Project, which sped up transit times for transit riders on the 504 King streetcar route, the Toronto Transit Commission's busiest surface route. As part of the busway plan, the only motor vehicles that could use the busway, between 5 a.m. to 10 p.m. daily, would be buses, trucks making deliveries on 14th Street, emergency and Access-A-Ride vehicles. Local traffic would be required to turn off 14th Street at the next intersection. Arthur Schwartz, a lawyer who lives on nearby 12th Street, blocked the plan by filing several injunctions to halt its implementation. As a result, the busway was not implemented as scheduled in July 2019; pushing its implementation back to August 2019. The plan was blocked once again, pending an appeal. The August ruling was later overturned by a panel of judges who approved the busway's implementation, which took effect on October 3, 2019. The busway was so successful on its first day that M14 buses had to be slowed down in order to keep from running ahead of their posted schedules.

Points of interest

From west to east, points of interest include:
 Little Island at Pier 55
 Hudson River Park
 High Line
 New York County National Bank (at Eighth Avenue), a New York City designated landmark
 New York Savings Bank (at Eighth Avenue), a New York City designated landmark and National Register of Historic Places (NRHP) landmark
 Norwood Club (241 West 14th Street), a New York City designated landmark
 154 West 14th Street, a New York City designated landmark
 144 West 14th Street, a New York City designated landmark
 The Salvation Army Greater New York Divisional Headquarters (120 West 14th Street), a New York City designated landmark
 Fourteenth Street Theatre (107 West 14th Street), demolished in 1938.
 R. H. Macy & Co. Store, 14th Street Annex (56 West 14th Street), a New York City designated landmark
 Baumann Brothers Furniture and Carpets Store (22-26 East 14th Street), a New York City designated landmark
 Lincoln Building (at Union Square West), a New York City designated landmark and NRHP landmark
 Union Square Park
 Consolidated Edison Building (at Irving Place), a New York City designated landmark
 First German Baptist Church (334 East 14th Street), a New York City designated landmark
 Grace Chapel (406 East 14th Street), a New York City designated landmark and NRHP landmark
 Immaculate Conception Roman Catholic Church/Grace Chapel Hospital (414 East 14th Street), a New York City designated landmark

See also 

List of numbered streets in Manhattan

References 
Notes

External links 

New York Songlines: 14th Street, a virtual walking tour

 
014
Chelsea, Manhattan
Meatpacking District, Manhattan
Gramercy Park
East Village, Manhattan
Union Square, Manhattan